Sath Rosib ( born 7 July 1997) is a Cambodian footballer who plays as a left-back for Cambodian Premier League club Preah Khan Reach Svay Rieng and the Cambodia national team.

Club career
Rosib made his senior debut in the Cambodian League in 2016 for Boeung Ket.

On 3 January 2023, Rosib was announced as a new player for Preah Khan Reach Svay Rieng.

International career
He made his debut in a friendly match against Laos national football team on 21 March 2018.

International goals
Scores and results list Cambodia's goal tally first.

Honours

Club
Boeung Ket
 Cambodian League: 2017

References

Living people
Cambodia international footballers
1997 births
Sportspeople from Phnom Penh
Cambodian footballers
Association football defenders
Nagaworld FC players
Competitors at the 2019 Southeast Asian Games
Southeast Asian Games competitors for Cambodia